Ere or ERE may refer to:

 Environmental and Resource Economics, a peer-reviewed academic journal
 ERE Informatique, one of the first French video game companies
 Ere language, an Austronesian language
 Ebi Ere (born 1981), American-Nigerian professional basketball player
 Ere, Tournai, a village in the Belgian province of Hainaut
 Essays in Radical Empiricism, a William James collection edited and published posthumously
 Extended regular expressions, a set of compliance in the IEEE POSIX regular expression standard
 Ere Gowda, Kannada film director
 National Radical Union, a Greek political party
 Eastern Roman Empire, a common term for the Byzantine Empire